Rees Griffith Richards (July 22, 1842 – February 10, 1917) was an American Republican politician who served as the 16th lieutenant governor of Ohio from 1882 to 1884.

Early life

Rees  G. Richards was born July 22, 1842 near Swansea, Wales, and lived there until age 10.  His family then moved to Ontario, Canada before removing to Tioga County, Pennsylvania.

Civil War

At the outbreak of the U.S. Civil War, he enlisted as a first sergeant in Company G of the 45th Pennsylvania Volunteer Infantry September 18, 1861. He was promoted to second lieutenant July 31, 1862, to captain September 14, 1862. He re-enlisted as a veteran January 1, 1864, and was captured at the Crater, July 30, 1864. He was held prisoner at Asylum Prison Camp near Charleston, South Carolina until his escape February 16, 1865.  He and two colleagues made it to Union lines at Chattanooga, Tennessee March 16, 1865. He was appointed brigade inspector May 11, 1865, and mustered out July 17, 1865.

Political

After the war, he moved to Youngstown, Ohio and engaged in mercantile business for two years, then six years in Irondale, Ohio. In 1873, and again in 1875, he was elected to represent Jefferson County, Ohio in the Ohio House of Representatives at the 61st and 62nd General Assemblies In 1876 he was admitted to the bar. He represented the 22nd district in the Ohio Senate in the 63rd and 64th General Assemblies (1878–1881). In 1881, he defeated Democrat Edgar M. Johnson for election as Lieutenant Governor of Ohio, and could have had the nomination in 1883, had he wanted it.

He was elected to two terms as Common Pleas Judge of Jefferson County while living in Steubenville, Ohio, starting in 1902, and died February 10, 1917.

Personal
Richards married Catherine C. Rees of Tioga County, Pennsylvania on November 22, 1865, and Elizabeth Johnson of Jefferson County, Ohio on September 25, 1894, who had one daughter. Richards was a Freemason and a Presbyterian by faith. He was a member of the Grand Army of the Republic and the Military Order of the Loyal Legion of the United States.

Notes

References

1842 births
1917 deaths
American Civil War prisoners of war
Lieutenant Governors of Ohio
Republican Party members of the Ohio House of Representatives
Ohio lawyers
Ohio state court judges
People of Pennsylvania in the American Civil War
Politicians from Steubenville, Ohio
Politicians from Swansea
People from Tioga County, Pennsylvania
Presidents of the Ohio State Senate
Republican Party Ohio state senators
Union Army officers
Welsh emigrants to the United States
19th-century American judges
19th-century American lawyers